Gadzhi Nadirovich Navruzov (born 11 April 1989) is a former Russian professional football player. Currently he is a professional fighter, competing in multiple disciplines.

Club career
He played in the Russian Football National League for FC SKA-Energiya Khabarovsk in 2010.

Fighting career 
After his footballing career Navruzov went on to become a fighter, earning himself the nickname "Assault Rifle" or "Machine Gun".

He made his fighting debut in 2012, while also still playing football. In March 2018 he became world champion Thai boxing. In March 2021 news agency Reuters ran a story on bareknuckle fighting in Russia which featured Navruzov.

According to fighting statistics website Tapology as of March 2023 Navruzov has a pro boxing record of 2-1-0.

References

External links
 
 Career summary at sportbox.ru
 
 Gadzhi Navruzov at Tapology

1989 births
Living people
Russian footballers
Association football defenders
FC SKA-Khabarovsk players
FC Sportakademklub Moscow players